Islam Mohamed Abdelhafiz Tolba (born February 8, 1989, in Alexandria) is an amateur Egyptian Greco-Roman wrestler, who competed in the men's middleweight category. Tolba represented Egypt at the 2012 Summer Olympics in London, where he participated in the men's 74 kg class. He lost his qualifying match to Croatia's Neven Žugaj, who was able to score four points in two straight periods, leaving Tolba without a single point.

References

External links
 NBC Olympics Profile
 

1989 births
Living people
Egyptian male sport wrestlers
Olympic wrestlers of Egypt
Wrestlers at the 2012 Summer Olympics
Sportspeople from Alexandria
21st-century Egyptian people